Cowboys and Cadillacs is the debut album of country singer Jaydee Bixby, who was the runner-up on the fifth season of Canadian Idol. The album was released in Canada on July 8, 2008. The first single from the album, "Old Fashioned Girl", was released on iTunes on June 17, 2008.

Background 
Jaydee placed second on the fifth season of Canadian Idol. After the show, he signed to Her Royal Majesty's Records in early 2008. The album was recorded in Vancouver, and released on July 8, 2008.

Jaydee released three more singles from this album, including "Boys in the Band", "Broken Windows" and "My So Called Life". Jaydee left the label in early 2010 and signed with On Ramp Records for his second album, Easy to Love.

Track listing

Chart performance 
The album sold over 21,000 copies in Canada. The album peaked at number 8 on the Canadian Albums Chart.

References

2008 debut albums
Jaydee Bixby albums